Kilik may refer to:

 Kilik (Air Gear), a character in the Air Gear anime/manga series
 Kilik (Soul Calibur), a character in the Soulcalibur video game series
 Kilik Pass, a mountain pass between China and Pakistan

See also
 Killik (disambiguation)